Jean André Soja (born February 13, 1946 in Behara) is a Malagasy politician. He is a member of the Senate of Madagascar for Anosy, and is a member of the Tiako I Madagasikara party.

External links
Official page on the Senate website 

1946 births
Living people
Members of the Senate (Madagascar)
Tiako I Madagasikara politicians
Place of birth missing (living people)